El Batalett, Femmes de la médina (English: The Heroines, Women of the Medina) is a 2000 documentary film directed by Dalila Ennadre. The film has been screened by a number of international film festivals.

Synopsis 
The film is set in the heart of the old medina of Casablanca. It follows a group of women who have lived there since their childhood. Together, between laughter and tears, they paint a complex image of the popular Moroccan woman, far from clichés, punctuated by their struggles and by major events such as the death of King Hassan II and the march of women for their rights in March 2000.

References 

2000s Arabic-language films
Documentary films about women
Moroccan documentary films
2000 documentary films